Ambatofisaka II is a rural municipality located in the Atsinanana region of eastern Madagascar.  It belongs to the Marolambo District.

The majority of its inhabitants are Betsimisaraka.

Eleven Fokontany (villages) belong to this municipality: Ambatofisaka II, Vofilambo, Ampasimazava, Anosiato, Ankiboka, Sahanambo, Anakalotre, Ambolomadinika, Antanjomanga, Ambalafarihy, Anosy, Sandranamby and Ambinanimangabe.

References

Populated places in Atsinanana